Lava Tongue Pass is a prominent north–south gully at  bisecting Radian Ridge in the Royal Society Range, Victoria Land, Antarctica. It was named descriptively by the New Zealand Geographic Board in 1994, following work in the area by a New Zealand Geological Survey field party, 1977–78, for a lava flow that fills the pass.

References

Mountain passes of Victoria Land
Scott Coast